The Kampala International School (KISU) is an international school in Kampala, Uganda, located in the neighborhood of Bukoto. It was formerly named Kabira International School of Uganda.

History 
KISU was established in 1993 with a student body of 67 individuals.

Renovations 
In November 2009, the school underwent renovations and upgrading for a total cost of USh 11 billion (US$5.8 million at the time). The new campus contains primary and secondary sections, four science laboratories, three computer laboratories, an eight-lane swimming pool, two amphitheatres, and multiple fully equipped and multimedia enabled classrooms.

These renovations gave KISU the capacity to accommodate up to 1,500 students and over 100 faculty members.

Curriculum

Primary school 
Kampala International School of Uganda has a primary section for students aged 2 to approximately 10/11 years of age. The school broadly follows the National Curriculum for England, modified to take into account the school's location and international student body.

KISU's Early years department incorporates KG2 (2 years of age), KG3 (3 years of age) and Reception (4 years of age).

Key Stage 1 (KS1) incorporates Year 1 (5 years of age) and Year 2 (6 years of age).

Key Stage 2 (KS2) incorporates Year 3 (7 years of age),Year 4 (8 years of age), Year 5 (9 years of age) and Year 6 (10 years of age)

In the Primary section, there are 2 or 3 classes per year group, depending on student numbers. Each class has both a teacher and at least one Teaching Assistant (T.A.).

Secondary school 
Secondary is from Years 7–13.

Key Stage 3 incorporates Years 7-9 (approx 11-14 years of age) and these students continue to study the National Curriculum for England, modified to reflect the nature of the school.

In Years 10 and 11 (15 to 16 years of age) students study an IGCSE programme (similar to UK IGCSEs but more international in nature). These examinations are undertaken through the Cambridge University and assessed by external examinations at the end of Year 11.

In Years 12 and 13 (17 and 18 years of age) students study the International Baccalaureate Diploma Programme, a 2-year course undertaken through the International Baccalaureate Organisation.

References

External links 
 School website
 Listing on Schoolnet Uganda

Schools in Kampala
International schools in Uganda
Ruparelia Group
Educational institutions established in 1993
1993 establishments in Uganda